Batchelor is an unincorporated community in Pointe Coupee Parish, Louisiana, United States. Batchelor has a post office with ZIP code 70715, which opened on July 26, 1902.

References

Unincorporated communities in Pointe Coupee Parish, Louisiana
Unincorporated communities in Louisiana